25K (or rather 25K THE PLUG), is a South African rapper and record producer whose full name is Lehlohonolo Molefe, he is best known for his 2017 single "Culture Vulture" which surfaced in early 2019, the remix features AKA and Emtee, and was also remixed by Boity Thulo.

The rapper released his debut album “Pheli Makaveli” curated by Zoocci Coke dope with Sony Music after closing a recording deal with the label.

Discography

Studio Albums

Awards and nominations

Notes

References

External links 
 

Living people
People from Pretoria
South African rappers
South African record producers
South African musicians
People from Gauteng
South African composers
South African songwriters
Sotho people
21st-century rappers
21st-century South African musicians
1994 births